Violator: The Album, V2.0 is the second and final installment in the Violator hip hop compilations series. It was released on July 24, 2001 through Violator/Loud Records as a sequel to 1999's Violator: The Album. Production was handled by several record producers, including Scott Storch, Bink!, Bryce Wilson, Irv Gotti, Just Blaze, 7 Aurelius, and Eric Nicks, who also served as executive producer together with Chris Lighty. It features guest appearances by the likes of JoJo Pellegrino, Remy Ma, Capone-N-Noreaga, Butch Cassidy, Mobb Deep, Big Noyd, CeeLo Green, Fabolous, Fat Joe, Ja Rule, Jadakiss, Kurupt, Memphis Bleek, Missy Elliott, Rah Digga, Spliff Star and Styles P among others. The album debuted at number 10 on the Billboard 200 and number 5 on the Top R&B/Hip-Hop Albums.

The album was supported with two singles: The Neptunes-produced "What It Is" performed by Busta Rhymes & Kelis, which later was included in Genesis, and Swizz Beatz-produced "Put Your Hands Up" performed by LL Cool J, which peaked at #50 on the Hot Rap Songs.

Track listing

Leftover track
 "Violator Run This" featuring Missy Elliott

Notes
 "Intro" features additional vocals from DJ Kay Slay and Kool DJ Red Alert and is missing on LP version
 "Come Thru" contains excerpts from "Early in the Morning" written by Mike Leander and Eddie Seago
 "Fiend" contains excerpts from "Microphone Fiend" written and performed by Eric B. & Rakim
 "U Feel Me/Options" is split on LP version as "U Feel Me" written and performed by Havoc, Fat Joe and Remy Ma, and "Options" written by Capone, Big Noyd and Bink! and performed by Capone and Noyd
 "Next Generation" contains excerpts from "New Generation" written by Darney Rivers, Anthony Carlos Smith, Teddy Riley and Robert Wells and performed by The Classical Two, and "Get on the Good Foot" written by James Brown, Fred Wesley and Joseph Mims and performed by James Brown
 "Can't Get Enough" contains a CD hidden track "Outro" written and produced by Richard "Rich Nice" Jackson featuring additional vocals from Kay Slay and Red Alert

Charts

References

External links

Sequel albums
2001 compilation albums
Violator (company) albums
Hip hop compilation albums
Albums produced by Irv Gotti
Albums produced by Just Blaze
Albums produced by Swizz Beatz
Albums produced by Scott Storch
Albums produced by the Neptunes
Record label compilation albums
Albums produced by Havoc (musician)
Albums produced by Bink (record producer)